The Baltimore Banners were a charter franchise of World Team Tennis (WTT) founded in 1974. The Banners lasted only one season but made a big splash by signing Jimmy Connors to a contract for $100,000 which obligated Connors to play in 22 of their 44 matches. Despite the presence of Connors, the Banners had 16 wins and 28 losses, and finished in third place in the Atlantic Section missing the playoffs. The Banners were contracted by WTT on February 1, 1975.

Team history
The Banners were founded as WTT's charter franchise for Phoenix, Arizona in 1973, by Gary Davidson. Before the team ever had a name in Phoenix, Davidson sold it to Howard Fine, Gerald Klauber, Joseph Rivkin and Robert E. Bradley, Jr. The new owners relocated the team to Baltimore, Maryland with a plan to have it play its home matches at the Baltimore Civic Center starting with the league's inaugural season in 1974 season and name it the Baltimore Banners.

The first 10 draft choices in the WTT inaugural draft made by what was at that time still the Phoenix franchise were

The first match in Banners history was a 35–20 home victory against the Hawaii Leis on May 8, 1975. The Banners started the season strong and had a record of 5–3 after eight matches. However, after a quarter of the season had passed, the Banners lost 23 of their final 33 matches to finish with 16 wins and 28 losses, third place in the Atlantic Section.

Banners superstar Jimmy Connors had the highest game-winning percentage in men's singles for the 1974 WTT season. Connors was not allowed to participate in the 1974 French Open due to his association with WTT. His exclusion from the French Open denied him the opportunity to become the first male player since Rod Laver to win all four Major singles titles in a calendar year.

The Banners struggled mightily to draw fans at home. Only 761 people showed up for their second home match of the season. The attendance for their final home match of the season was just 1,065.
 
At the WTT owners meeting on February 1, 1975, each team was required to post a $500,000 letter of credit. The Banners failed to do so and were contracted by WTT. A dispersal draft was conducted to distribute the players among the remaining teams in the league.

Roster
 Don Candy, Player-Coach
 Bob Carmichael
 Jimmy Connors
 Joyce Hume
 Kathy Kuykendall
 Audrey Morse
 Jay Mukerjea
 Betty Stöve

Jimmy Connors was the only Banners player to have been enshrined in the International Tennis Hall of Fame.

See also

 World TeamTennis
 1974 World Team Tennis season

References

External links
 Official World TeamTennis Website

Defunct World TeamTennis teams
Tennis in Maryland
Sports teams in Baltimore
Sports clubs established in 1973
1973 establishments in Maryland
Sports clubs disestablished in 1975
1975 disestablishments in Maryland